The Ulverstone Football Club, nicknamed the Robins, is an Australian rules football club based in Ulverstone, Tasmania, Australia. The club fields three teams in the North West Football League and also fields two junior teams in the AFL Tasmania North West Competition.

History

Home ground – Ulverstone Recreation Ground
Established – 1888 as Leven Football Club
Playing colours – Red and black
Emblem – Robins
Club theme song – "We are the Red and Blacks" (Tune: "Lily of Laguna")
Affiliations – NWFA (1894–1909), NWFL (1909), NWFU (1910–1986), NTFL/NWFL (1987–present)

Premiership titles
NWFA Premierships
1900, 1903, 1906.

NWFU Premierships 
1910, 1923, 1935, 1947, 1950, 1951, 1953, 1955, 1956, 1957, 1976, 1986.

NTFL/NWFL Premierships
1987, 1990, 1993, 1994, 1995, 1996, 1997, 2000, 2009, 2017.

Tasmanian State Premierships
1955, 1976.

Individual medal winners
Cheel Medal winners 
 1923 – Stan Trebilco
 1929 – Tas Langmaid

Wright Medal winners 
 1930 – Jim Brown

Wander Medal winners 
 1951 – Jack Rough
 1955 – Arthur Hodgson
 1962 – Jock O'Brien
 1981 – John Murphy

Ovaltine Medal winners 
 1993 – Reg Horton
 1996 – Nathan Howard

Pivot Medal winners 
 1997 – Nathan Howard
 1999 – Simon Walmsley

Darrel Baldock Medal winners 
 2001 – Scott Blair
 2010 - Justin Hays

Competition leading goalkickers
NWFU leading goalkickers 
 1912 – J. Palliser (24)
 1925 – H. McDonald (47)
 1935 – M. Johnson (60)
 1946 – R. Stott (80)
 1951 – S. Walker (73)
 1964 – W. Pearce (65)
 1969 – K. Mahoney (79)

NTFL/NWFL leading goalkickers
 1997 – J. Auton (95)

Club records
Club record score 
 44.28 (292) v Penguin 3.3 (21) in 1991

'''Club record games holder 
 Wayne Wing (369)

Club record match attendance
 11,866 – Ulverstone v East Devonport at West Park Oval for the 1968 NWFU Grand Final.

References

External links

Official website

Australian rules football clubs in Tasmania
1888 establishments in Australia
Australian rules football clubs established in 1888
North West Football League clubs
Ulverstone, Tasmania